Chetlo Harbor may refer to:

Chetlo Harbor, Washington, a natural harbor located at the mouth of the Naselle River in Willapa Bay, on the southwest Pacific coast of Washington state
Chetlo Harbor Packing Company, a defunct salmon cannery that operated in 1912 and 1914